Ali al-Shemari is an Iraqi politician from the Sadrist Movement who was the Health Minister of Iraq from May 20, 2006, until April 16, 2007.

Al-Shemari's deputy, Hakim al-Zamili, and his security chief, Hamid al-Shammari, were arrested and tried in 2007 on claims they ran a death squad that attacked Sunni Arabs patients and visitors in Health Ministry hospitals. Among their supposed victims was Ammar al-Saffar, another deputy health minister who was preparing to expose corruption in the ministry, kidnapped in November 2006. Both men were cleared of all charges when key witnesses failed to show up after facing alleged intimidation.

Following the arrest of his deputies, Shemari fled Iraq.

Iraq War casualty estimate

While Health Minister, al-Shemari estimated that between the March 2003 invasion of Iraq and November 2006 there had been 100,000 to 150,000 Iraqi violent deaths.

From a November 9, 2006 International Herald Tribune article:

"Each day we lost 100 persons, that means per month 3,000, per year it's 36,000, plus or minus 10 percent," al-Shemari said. "So by three years, 120,000, half year 20,000, that means 140,000, plus or minus 10 percent," he said, explaining how he came to the figures. "This includes all Iraqis killed — police, ordinary people, children," he said, adding that people who were kidnapped and later found dead were also included in his estimate. He said the figures were compiled by counting bodies brought to "forensic institutes" or hospitals.

A November 11, 2006 Taipei Times story reported:

"Al-Shemari said on Thursday [Nov. 9, 2006] that he based his figure on an estimate of 100 bodies per day brought to morgues and hospitals -- though such a calculation would come out closer to 130,000 in total."

The article also stated:

An official with the ministry also confirmed the figure yesterday [Nov. 10, 2006], but later said that the estimated deaths ranged between 100,000 and 150,000. "The minister was misquoted. He said between 100,000-150,000 people were killed in three-and-a-half years," the official said.

See also 

Council of Ministers of Iraq
Iraqi Health Ministry casualty survey
Casualties of the Iraq War
Iraq War

References 

Living people
Government ministers of Iraq
Iraq War casualties
Year of birth missing (living people)